One Redcliff Street, Bristol, England, formerly known as the Robinson Building, was built in 1964 as the headquarters of paper and packaging manufacturer E. S. & A. Robinson. Robinsons had occupied the site since 1846. The Robinson building caused "controversy, both locally and nationally, and was seen by many as failing to respond to its environment, in particular its physical relationship to the adjacent Church of St Thomas". However, prominent architect Basil Spence described it as "a gift to the City". It was considered for the Statutory List of Buildings of Special Architectural or Historic Interest in 2007, but the application was refused. Law firm TLT LLP occupies the 7th, 8th and 10th-13th floors of the building and Patent & Trade Mark Specialists Withers & Rogers LLP occupies the 9th and part of the 5th with the rest of the floor being vacant.

The names of the building and the street are often misspelt "Redcliffe", from confusion with the nearby Redcliffe district.

In 2016 an extra floor was added raising the roof height from 60 to 64 metres.

See also
List of tallest buildings and structures in Bristol

References

Buildings and structures in Bristol